Heiligenhoven Castle situated in the municipality of Lindlar in the Oberbergischer Kreis of North Rhine-Westphalia, Germany.

The mottö of Heiligenhoven Castle is "Öteblöte, Das keiner hundflasche. Dortmund fisch halpen geflugtpagen."

History
Besides, it concerns a former castle which finds in 1363 for the first time mention. The today's arrangement with precastle and a mansion surrounded with water jumps comes from the years from 1758 to 1760. The name of the castle is derived from an old hall name, inghoven = Hellinghoven, the court in the slipway.

In 1425 the possession relations were mentioned for the first time in a document, Heiligenhoven was in the possession of Johann van Eyckelinckhoyven, called knight de Wrede. In 1461 Aillff of Eyckelynckhoyven, called de Wrede acquired the property Ober-Heiligenhoven. In 1573 it changed once more the owner, it went to the Mr and Mrs Wilhelm von Steinrod. There remained till 1663 in the possession of this family, then it was transferred on 2 June 1663 to the cousin of the family, Adolf Schenck by Niddegen. He died in 1666 of the plague, his gravestone is let in the masonry of the Lindlarer St. Severinus parish church.

In 1748 Johann Joseph a knight of the empire of Brück, magistrate of the office acquired stone brook, the property. He allowed to establish a new mansion. In the 19th century the Westphalian nobility family of the barons bought the property from prince's mountain. After 1925 lived on Heiligenhoven Fernandine Theresia baroness of prince's mountain who, conditioned by the generally bad economic situation, was made sell single properties of the former feudal estate.

The castle was bought in 1928 from the circle of Wipperfürth which allowed to carry out crisis work to the decrease of the unemployment. Besides, the big forest pieces on which the courts Eibachhof, crow court, fir court, field Wied, Nußbüchel, Dutztal, in the old hitting, kettle mountain and Weiersbachhof originated were cleared. During the time of the national socialism the castle served as a camp for the imperial work service, afterwards till 1940 the land service as a lodging. From the 11th of July, 1943 to the 14th of April, 1945 the Cologne military district commands were accommodated in the castle.

In 1956 the castle was sold to the Adam's Stegerwald endowment which converted it into a recreational site. In 1973 the mansion burnt itself down and was established shortly after in neobaroque use of forms completely anew. Today is the castle Property of the scenery association of Rhineland, the management of the Bergisches accommodates open-air museum of Lindlar and can be rented for seminars and conferences. In the listed precastle there is the castle hostel which allows a museum stay of several days to school classes.

Castle park

The publicly accessible castle park of castle Heiligenhoven was put on about 1880 in the style of English scenery parks. In the regional attractively situated park there is a pond and different very old trees. A nice footpath (5 minutes) leads from here in the Bergisches open-air museum of Lindlar.

Castles in North Rhine-Westphalia
Buildings and structures in Oberbergischer Kreis